Market Square Historic District may refer to:

West Market Square Historic District, Bangor, Maine, listed on the National Register of Historic Places (NRHP) in Penobscot County, Maine
Market Square Historic District (Houlton, Maine), listed on the NRHP in Aroostook County, Maine
Market Square Historic District (Newburyport, Massachusetts), NRHP-listed
Market Square Historic District (Buffalo, New York), NRHP-listed
Market Square (Miamisburg, Ohio), NRHP-listed
Market Square Historic District (Pittsburgh, Pennsylvania), a Pittsburgh Landmark
Market Square-Patten Parkway, Chattanooga, Tennessee, listed on the NRHP in Hamilton County, Tennessee
Market Square Commercial Historic District, Knoxville, Tennessee
Main Street Market Square Historic District, Houston, Texas, NRHP-listed
Fredericksburg Town Hall and Market Square, Fredericksburg, Virginia
Centre Market Square Historic District, Wheeling, West Virginia, listed on the NRHP in Ohio County, West Virginia
Market Square Historic District (St. Joseph, Missouri)